The 1995 Internazionali Femminili di Palermo was a women's tennis tournament played on outdoor clay courts at the Country Time Club in Palermo, Italy that was part of the Tier IV category of the 1995 WTA Tour. It was the eighth edition of the tournament and was held from 10 July until 16 July 1995. Second-seeded Irina Spîrlea won her second consecutive singles title at the event and earned $17,500 first-prize money.

Finals

Singles

 Irina Spîrlea defeated  Sabine Hack 7–6(7–1), 6–2
 It was Spîrlea's 1st singles title of the year and the 2nd of her career.

Doubles

 Radka Bobková /  Petra Langrová defeated  Petra Schwarz /  Katarína Studeníková 6–4, 6–1
 It was Bobkova's only title of the year and the 4th of her career. It was Langrová's only title of the year and the 6th of her career.

References

External links
 ITF tournament edition details
 Tournament draws

Internazionali Femminili di Palermo
Internazionali Femminili di Palermo
1995 in Italian women's sport
Torneo